Allen Thomson Gunnell (January 20, 1848 – March 21, 1907) was an American lawyer, judge, and state legislator in Colorado.

Gunnell was born in Missouri where he began his legal career. He settled in Colorado in 1875. He served in the Colorado House of Representatives and Colorado Senate.  He was a lawyer and represented owners of mining companies.

The Colorado Springs Pioneers Museum has an oil painting of him.

References

External links
Allen Thomson Gunnell Findagrave entry

Colorado state senators
Colorado lawyers
Missouri lawyers
1960 deaths
1848 births